Veysal Rzayev (born on 24 October 2002) is an Azerbaijani professional footballer who plays as a midfielder for Sabah in the Azerbaijan Premier League.

Career

Club
On 2 October 2020, Nuriyev made his debut in the Azerbaijan Premier League for Sabah match against Keşla.

References

External links
 

2002 births
Living people
Association football midfielders
Azerbaijani footballers
Azerbaijan youth international footballers
Azerbaijan Premier League players
Sabah FC (Azerbaijan) players